The Men's Boxing Tournament at the 2007 Pan American Games was held in Rio de Janeiro, Brazil from July 20 to July 28. It served as a qualification tournament for the 2008 Summer Olympics in Beijing, PR China. The number one and two earned a ticket for the Olympic Tournament.

There were three qualifying events for the Boxing Tournament at the 2007 Pan American Games:
 Pan American Games Qualifier 1 in Barquisimeto, Venezuela from February 2 to February 8, 2007
 Pan American Games Qualifier 2 in Buenos Aires, Argentina from March 15 to March 20, 2007
 Pan American Games Qualifier 3 in Port of Spain, Trinidad from April 23 to April 28, 2007

Medal winners

Medal table

External links
 Results

Events at the 2007 Pan American Games
Boxing at the Pan American Games
Pan American Games